6013 aluminium alloy consist of magnesium, silicon, copper, manganese, iron, zinc, chromium, and titanium as minor alloying elements.

Chemical Composition

Mechanical Properties

Applications 
 Valves
 Machine parts
 Munitions
 ABS Braking systems
 Hydraulic applications
 Roller blade parts

References 

Aluminium–magnesium–silicon alloys